Aleynik is a surname. Notable people with the surname include:

Oleg Aleynik (born 1989), Russian footballer
Vladimir Aleynik (born 1952), Belarusian diver